Ayfer Elmastaşoğlu (born 16 February 1944) is a Turkish former professional footballer and football manager. Elmastaşoğlu spent his entire playing career with Altay and captained them to their first Turkish Cup win in 1967. He also managed them for their second and final Turkish Cup victory in 1980.

International career
Elmastaşoğlu was a youth international for Turkey, and represented the senior Turkey team 3 times. He debuted for Turkey in a 0-0 friendly tie with Denmark on 30 May 1966.

Personal life
Elmastaşoğlu's brothers, Ayhan and Nail, were also professional footballers.

Honours

Player 
Altay
 Turkish Cup: 1966-67

Manager 
Altay
 Turkish Cup: 1979-80

References

External links
TFF Profile
TFF Manager Profile
Mackolik Profile
Mackolik Manager Profile
NFT Profile

1944 births
Living people
Sportspeople from İzmir
Turkish footballers
Turkey international footballers
Turkey youth international footballers
Turkish football managers
Association football midfielders
Süper Lig managers
Altay S.K. managers
Manisaspor managers
Bucaspor managers
Göztepe S.K. managers